The ZEC Petawaga is a "zone d'exploitation contrôlée" (controlled harvesting zone) located in the area of Mont-Laurier, in Antoine-Labelle Regional County Municipality, in the Laurentides, in Quebec, in Canada.

The zec is managed by the "Association chasse et pêche de la région de Mont-Laurier inc".

Geography 
Zec Petawaga shares its boundaries with the Zec Lesueur in the east, La Verendrye Wildlife Reserve in the west. Its eastern border is the Baskatong Reservoir. The zec is bounded on the north by the free territory extending to Clova. Zec counts 314 lakes, of which a hundred are used for recreational fishing.

History 

Founded in 1952, the "l'association chasse et pêche de la région de Mont-Laurier inc" had originally the mission of seeding fishes. After organizing several sports-related activities and social in the region, the association has established the International Classic boat which attracted more than 15,000 people annually.

In 1978, the Quebec government entrusted the association is responsible for administering the ZEC Petawaga.

Toponymy 
Petawaga comes from the original word in Algonquin . This name took over the place-name Petawaga Lake, which is located in the ZEC.

References

Attachments

Related articles
 Mont-Laurier, municipality
 Antoine-Labelle Regional County Municipality, (MRC)
 Laurentides, an administrative region of Québec
 Baskatong Reservoir
 Zone d'exploitation contrôlée (Controlled harvesting zone) (ZEC)

External links 
  of the zec Petawaga.

Protected areas of Laurentides
Protected areas established in 1978
1978 establishments in Quebec